Gulfport Shipbuilding Corporation (also called Gulfport Boiler & Welding Works) was a shipbuilding company at Port Arthur, Texas, formed as Gulfport Boiler & Welding Works opened in 1930. For World War II Gulfport built Tank Barges a Type B ship and Tugboats a Type V ship. The shipyard closed in 1985.

 Notable ship:

 drydock

:Category:Ships built in Port Arthur, Texas

Notes

Defunct shipbuilding companies of the United States
Port Arthur, Texas